Make It Big is a 2002 South Korean comedy film. Song Seung-heon, Kim Young-jun and Kwon Sang-woo play three high school students who are startled when a bagful of money and a dead man fall on top of their car. Once they realize just how much money is in the bag, they give up any thought of calling the police.

Plot
Three high school boys seem to have little in common, but one day they happen to sit next to each other at the back of the classroom. They soon become good friends, though they are always arguing or teasing each other. One day as they're jumping over the school wall, a thief falls out of nowhere and passes out right in front of them. He is holding a bag full of dollars. Not knowing what to do, they decide to take the bag first and think things out later. Meanwhile, Ji-hyeong is a rookie detective on his 100th day at the station, and is always busy trying to catch criminals ranging from drug dealers to petty thieves. Hearing that a usurer’s house had been robbed, he goes to investigate the case. But he gets orders to close the case, and he starts to get curious. He decides to continue investigating, in secret. Seong-hwan, Woo-seob and Jin-won have long since forgotten how scared they were at the beginning, and they are having a spending spree. Ji-hyeong’s investigation brings him closer and closer to them. Meanwhile, others are looking for the bag of cash too, and they are closing in on them fast.

Cast
Song Seung-heon as Seong-hwan 
Kim Young-jun as Jin-won 
Kwon Sang-woo  as Woo-seob 
Lee Beom-soo as Ji-hyeong 	
Im Jung-eun as Yoo-jin
Lee Moon-sik as thief
Jung Gyu-soo as secretary
Jung Kyung-ho as policeman
Lee Ji-hyun as beautiful woman with pet
Lee Kan-hee as Seong-hwan's mother
Im Seung-dae as doctor
Park Jae-woong as gangster
Marco as James
Kim Seon-hwa as Versace staff member
Kim Han as man of shaking head
Lee Sun-kyun as Woo Jung-chul
Lee Ji-hyun as Jang-soo
Park Jin-taek as driver
Kim Joong-ki (bit part)
Jo Dong-hyuk (bit part)

Notes
Song and Kwon became close friends in real life, and later starred together again in the 2008 film Fate.

References

External links
 https://web.archive.org/web/20130604121655/http://ildanrun.com/
 Make It Big at Cineclick Asia
 
 

South Korean action comedy films
2002 films
South Korean teen films
2000s South Korean films